Hayley Carter (born May 17, 1995) is an inactive American tennis player. She has a career-high WTA doubles ranking of No. 25, which she achieved on 14 June 2021. Carter is primarily a doubles player. She has won two WTA Tour and two WTA 125 doubles titles, as well as nine on the ITF Women's Circuit.

Junior career
Carter played at the Smith Stearn's Tennis Academy growing up. She also won a record 14 South Carolina state championships. Between 2009 and 2012, she won three ITF Junior Circuit singles titles, as well as one doubles title.

Carter played collegiate tennis for the North Carolina Tar Heels, where she earned All-American honors each of the four years she competed. She is the Atlantic Coast Conference's all-time leader in women's tennis singles victories with 168.

Professional career

2019: New partnership with Stefani, maiden WTA Tour title
In September 2019, with Luisa Stefani as partner, she reached her first doubles final on the WTA Tour at the Korea Open, and the following week, they won their first WTA Tour title together at the Tashkent Open. Thereafter, Carter established a fixed partnership with Stefani.

2020: Top 40 debut
The Carter/Stefani duo reached the third round for the first time at a major at the 2020 Australian Open where they were defeated by sixth seeded duo Gabriela Dabrowski/Jelena Ostapenko.

They won the title at the Newport Beach Challenger, which was the second year in a row that Carter had won this event (with Ena Shibahara in 2019). They also reached the Dubai Tennis Championships quarterfinals in February, and won the Lexington Open in August. With that, they entered the top 40 for the first time.

At the Italian Open, they had another great tournament, reaching the semifinals and losing only to the top seeds Hsieh/Strycová. 

The pair's best result at a Grand Slam championship came at the US Open where they reached the quarterfinals, defeating the No. 6 seeds Japan duo of Shuko Aoyama and Ena Shibahara in the round of 16.

2021: WTA 1000 doubles finalist, top 25, surgery & early end of season
Carter reached her best result at the WTA 1000-level by becoming a doubles finalist alongside Stefani at Miami, being eventually defeated by the fifth seeded duo Aoyama/Shibahara. During the Wimbledon Championships, Carter injured her foot and decided to sit out the rest of the 2021 season, instead joining the coaching staff of the Vanderbilt Commodores. Before going through surgery, she took part in three WTA tournaments in the United States, the Cincinnati Open alongside Sabrina Santamaria, the US Open with Astra Sharma, and Indian Wells alongside her new partner Gabriela Dabrowski.

Grand Slam performance timelines

Doubles

Mixed doubles

Significant finals

WTA 1000 tournaments

Doubles: 1 (runner-up)

WTA career finals

Doubles: 8 (2 titles, 6 runner-ups)

WTA 125 tournament finals

Doubles: 3 (2 titles, 1 runner-up)

ITF Circuit finals

Singles: 2 (2 runner–ups)

Doubles: 14 (9 titles, 5 runner–ups)

World TeamTennis
Carter made her World TeamTennis debut in 2020.

References

External links
 
 
 Profile on North Carolina's website
 Profile on Vanderbilt's website

1995 births
Living people
American female tennis players
North Carolina Tar Heels women's tennis players
People from Hilton Head, South Carolina
Tennis people from South Carolina